William Bourne de Derby (fl. 1297), was an English politician.

He was a Member (MP) of the Parliament of England for Derby in 1297.

References

Year of birth missing
Year of death missing
English MPs 1297